The Revenge of History: The Battle for the Twenty-First Century is a 2012 book by British journalist and writer Seumas Milne. An updated edition was published in 2013.

Synopsis
The book is a collection of Milne's columns published in The Guardian over 10 years. 
Verso Books describes The Revenge of History as a "coruscating account of the first decade of the twenty-first century... a powerful indictment of the United States, a global and corporate empire in decline. Milne also examines the causes of the credit crisis and the Great Recession, reveals the policy of humanitarian military intervention to be a failed land grab, explains the dynamo behind the roaring Chinese economy and discovers new models of society flourishing in Latin America. Brilliant, bold and always incisive, The Revenge of History is essential reading for anyone wanting to understand what has gone wrong".

Reception
Naomi Klein praised The Revenge of History as "a book with an urgent message" and wrote that "Reading Seumas Milne, one often has a feeling of physical relief: finally someone not only sees the truth but articulates it with thrilling erudition and moral clarity".

In The Guardian Owen Hatherley wrote "Milne has a knack for making arguments which when published are excoriated as unforgivable, and which then gradually become guiltily commonsensical" and broadly praised the work. 

Al Jazeera published a review which suggested that "As The Revenge of History reminds us, it is the left which has got the major judgement calls of the last 10 years – on economic and foreign policy – essentially correct, while the political right and many mainstream liberals have got them badly wrong" and which also praised the book.

References

2012 non-fiction books
Books by Seumas Milne
Books about foreign relations of the United States
Books about international relations
Books about imperialism
Books critical of capitalism
Books about socialism
English-language books
War on Terror books
Verso Books books